Hanover Junction is a small unincorporated community in south-central York County, Pennsylvania, United States, near the borough of Seven Valleys.  The junction serves as a rest stop on the York County Heritage Rail Trail.

History

Established in 1851 as a railroad junction of the Northern Central Railway and the Hanover Branch Railroad, a hotel and a few houses were erected to serve the needs of railroad passengers and local workers.  Following the 1863 Battle of Gettysburg, Hanover Junction was a major route for the transport of wounded soldiers from Gettysburg to hospitals in Baltimore, Harrisburg, York, and other Northern towns.  A bust of President Abraham Lincoln and a historical marker commemorate his change of trains at the junction en route to Gettysburg to deliver the 1863 Gettysburg Address.

Later, small industries flourished in the Hanover Junction area, but with the demise of the railroad traffic in the mid-20th century, the depot was abandoned. It was restored to its Civil War appearance in 2003 and reopened as a museum.  A quartet of Civil War cannons commemorate the region's participation in the Gettysburg Campaign.

The Hanover Junction Railroad Station was added to the National Register of Historic Places in 1983.

References

External links
 Blakesee, R. G., Hanover Junction photographs at nycivilwar.us/hanjunc.html. Retrieved 2008-11-07.
 Shaffer, Roger E., History of Hanover Junction. Retrieved 2008-11-07.

Unincorporated communities in York County, Pennsylvania
Railroad museums in Pennsylvania
Unincorporated communities in Pennsylvania
1854 establishments in Pennsylvania